The Members of the Covenant were a part of early Syriac Christianity. Before the advent of true monasticism (which developed in the desert of Egypt), most Syriac churches consisted of a community focused around the "members of the covenant": men and women who had committed themselves to sexual abstinence and the service of the church. This name is the English translation of the Syriac bnay qyāmâ (ܒܢܝ ܩܝܡܐ), literally sons of the covenant. A male member of the covenant was called bar qyāmâ (ܒܪ ܩܝܡܐ), or son of the covenant; a female member was bat qyāmâ (ܒܪܬ ܩܝܡܐ), or daughter of the covenant.

With only a few exceptions, Syrian monks learned to live among the people, both Christian and non-Christian, living the strict ascetic lifestyle while still maintaining full cohesion in the world. The eastern ascetics saw their spiritually disciplined life as a journey of steps, adopting the notion that all were equal in God's eyes, each finding oneself on a stairway of godliness that led ultimately towards eternity with God.

Background

Third Century
Unlike Egyptian monks, who saw their figurehead as Anthony the Great, Syrian monks based their purpose and practice on apostolic precedent and the life and teachings of Christ and his disciples. From its very beginning, Syriac Christianity was intrinsically an ascetical faith built on its reactions and adoptions from Marcionism and Manichaeism, among other cultural influences, which promoted the Christian faith as radical dedication and sacrifice. Unlike Egyptian monks who felt they needed to escape Roman rule in order to live ascetic lives, Syriac ascetics remained enmeshed in the church and lost culture that surrounded them.

The overwhelming presence of Western monasticism was not foreign to Syrian Christians seeking ascetic life. Theodoret gives historians a rendition of the early individualistic tendencies of Syrian monks in his book about their history. Notable examples of extreme asceticism included the  boskoi "grazers", monks who lived in the wild and were often mistaken for strange animals. Wrapped in goatskins or straw mats, they avoided all forms of artificial clothing or shelter and only ate what they were given or they found growing on the ground. 

Christian groups in the regions of the Sasanian Empire were developing and expressing themselves in radically different ways because there was no overarching rule governing the civilization of Christianity, (unlike Christians living in Roman Empire). In contrast to the staunch individualistic faith seen in the rural wildernesses around them, Christians in Persian urban areas were more intent on creating a community of believers by creating and transforming it through Christian discipleship. "From the earliest times asceticism played an integral and affirming role in the communities and the faith of Syrian Christians ... discipleship to Christ, lived out by laymen and women through varying degrees ... constituted the highest expression of Christian life." Communal monasticism became more and more common during the early part of the fourth century, leaving behind the influences of the Egyptian ascetic paradigm.

Emergence of the Members of the Covenant

Fourth Century
During the fourth century and beyond, the image of Christians as "strangers" emerged. Monks of this lineage acted as a missionary to their communities, building a life around hospitality to others, serving the poor, and standing up for cases of social justice. "For them, following Christ meant active engagement, as Christ’s representatives, with the ‘world’ they had renounced, rather than permanent social withdrawal." It is out of this context that the "Sons and Daughters of the Covenant" were born. "We must be reminded that the first Christian impulses in the lands of the Euphrates and Tigris did not come from Hellenistic Christianity via Antioch but from Palestinian Jewish Christianity ... these archaic conditions, which understood the qeiama as the whole congregation of celibates who alone were admitted to baptism and sacramental life, were tenacious and were able to last for generations." 

During this time historical records of the Syrian church indicate that they began to initiate Roman concepts of church into their practice. This led to divisions between the benai and benat qeiama and the married and vocational members of the church who were also active participants in society. However, the two groups were able to merge and adopted a syncretism of belief in which they understood their spiritual growth as steps.

From the beginning of the fourth century, the Sons and Daughters of the Covenant saw their mission as deeply interwoven with the congregational church. The members of the qeiama understood themselves to be equivalent to modern-day deacons. They usually lived together or with family members, but there are instances of the benat qeiama living in convents and other communal organizations where they could live and study together. Each of them took the vow of chastity in becoming a member of the covenant, and through this vow they saw themselves as "brides of Christ". They followed strict rules that did not allow them to be out after dark or for the benat to live with a man. They had a judicial law that sent dysfunctional covenanters to a secluded monastery and renamed them bart qeiama, denoting their failure to live up to the life-covenant to which they were called.

Functionally the qeiama were students and servants of the clergy. There were certain rules against a Son or Daughter becoming a hireling or staff for a farmer, or any other vocation; they were to be completely devoted to the works and ministries of the church. Members of the qeiama were also directly involved with the worship service itself. Outside of the worship service, the benai and benat qeiama were set to the task of serving and blessing others in the congregation, as well as those not connected to a place of Christian faith.

A hospital was built from the efforts of one congregation's Covenant Group. "Active believers and energetic deacons were appointed to direct the work, but for the actual service, Rabbula employed the benai qeiama." Roles were mirrored for the women's hospital built nearby. Qeiama also established charities for lepers in their villages and built shelters for the poor and destitute. 

Qeiama were seen as vital to the Christian community. One source remarking on the necessity of the Covenant members states, "the churches and monasteries will be constituted (or will have their existence) through them."

Further reading

 Baker, Aelred. "Early Syriac Asceticism." Downside Review 88, (1970): 393-409.
 "Fasting to the World." Journal of Biblical Literature 84, (1965): 291-95.
 "The Significance of the New Testament Text of the Syriac Liber Graduum." Studia Evangelica 5, (1968): 171-75.
 Bolsinger, Tod E. It Takes a Church to Raise a Christian. Grand Rapids: Brazos, 2004.
 Bondi, Roberta C. "Christianity and Cultural Diversity" in ed. Bernard McGinn, Christian Spirituality: Origins to the Twelfth Century. New York: Crossroad, 1985.
 The Book of Steps: The Syriac Liber Graduum. Translated and introduction by Robert A. Kitchen and Martien F.G. Parmentier. Kalamazoo, MI: Cistercian, 2004.
 Caner, Daniel. Wandering, Begging Monks: Spiritual Authority and the Promotion of Monasticism in Late Antiquity. Berkeley: University of California, 2002.
 Gribomont, Jean. "Monasticism and Asceticism" in Bernard McGinn, ed., Christian Spirituality: Origins to the Twelfth Century. New York: Crossroad, 1985.
 Murray, Robert. "The Exhortation to Candidates for Ascetical Vows at Baptism in the Ancient Syriac Church." New Testament Studies 21, (1974/5): 59-80.
 Theodoret of Cyrrhus: A History of the Monks of Syria. Translated R. M. Price, Cistercian Studies 88, Kalamazoo, MI: Cistercian, 1985.
 Vööbus, Arthur, "The Institution of the Benai Qeiama and Benat Qeiama in the Ancient Syrian Church." Church History 30, (1961): 19-27.

References

Asceticism
Eastern Orthodox orders and societies
Syriac Orthodox monasteries